Zbludza  is a village in the administrative district of Gmina Kamienica, within Limanowa County, Lesser Poland Voivodeship, in southern Poland.

The village has an approximate population of 600.

References

Villages in Limanowa County